The Michigan Womyn's Music Festival, often referred to as MWMF or Michfest, was a feminist women's music festival held annually from 1976 to 2015 in Oceana County, Michigan, on privately owned woodland near Hart Township referred to as "The Land" by Michfest organizers and attendees. The event was built, staffed, run, and attended exclusively by women, with girls, young boys and toddlers permitted. 

From 1991, the festival excluded trans women, adopting a "womyn-born womyn" policy, which drew increasing criticism. The festival was picketed by Camp Trans starting in the 1990's for its exclusionary policy. LGBT advocacy group Equality Michigan boycotted the event in 2014. Michfest drew criticism from the Human Rights Campaign, GLAAD, the National Center for Lesbian Rights, and the National LGBTQ Task Force, among others. The festival held its final event in August 2015.

History

Background
The first women's music festivals in the United States were founded in the early 1970s, starting with day festivals at the Sacramento State and San Diego State University campuses, the Midwest Women's Festival in Missouri, the Boston Women's Music Festival, and the National Women's Music Festival at the University of Illinois at Urbana–Champaign. These first regional women-only events exposed audiences to feminist and openly lesbian artists, most of whom operated independently of the mainstream recording industry. Festival gatherings offered an alternative to urban bars, coffeehouses and protest marches, which were some of the few opportunities for lesbians to meet one another in the early 1970s. The feminist separatism of the spaces was a direct outgrowth of, and solidarity with, the activism created by black power and other racial solidarity movements.

1970s
In 1976, Lisa Vogel, along with sister Kristie Vogel and friend Mary Kindig, founded the Michigan Womyn's Music Festival after attending an indoor festival of women's music in Boston the year before. They were joined by local businesswoman Susan Alborell. When their application to form a non-profit collective was denied, the We Want the Music Corporation was structured as the parent company of MWMF.  Michfest was initially conceptualized as an event attended by women and feminist men; however, it became a women-only festival when the characteristics of outdoor camping were taken into consideration. MWMF was thereafter established as "an event for lesbians". Years later, author and feminist scholar Bonnie Morris would describe Michfest as "an entire city run by and for lesbian feminists. Utopia revealed. And Eden—built by Eves."

1980s
In 1982, Michfest moved to what would become its long-term 650-acre location near Hart, Michigan. In subsequent years it would add an acoustic stage and an open mic stage, in addition to day stage and night stage programming. Cement-paved walkways were added to ease access for women with mobility challenges and baby strollers. Barbara "Boo" Price became Vogel's business partner after the 1985 festival and was increasingly involved with production until the two parted ways in 1994. A 10th-anniversary double album was produced in 1985, and in 1986, the festival expanded to five days. The festival was hampered by an outbreak of shigella in 1988.

1990s and 2000s

In the 1990s, Michfest added a runway to the Night Stage and a mosh pit. Notable artists invited to the event during this era included  the Indigo Girls and Tribe 8.

Exclusion controversy
In 1991, trans woman Nancy Jean Burkholder was asked to leave the festival. This was retroactively justified by the instatement of a "womyn-born-womyn" policy, as named by Vogel. Vogel stated in 2013 that Michfest was intended for "womyn who at birth were deemed female". The practical effect was that trans women were excluded from the festival, which became the subject of increasing criticism.

In 1992, Burkholder had a survey circulated at Michfest that asked, "Do you think male-to-female transsexuals should be welcome at Michigan?" Although the sample was not "randomly selected", the results were interpreted as indicating that the greater number of those who attended MWMF would be against the exclusion of transsexual women, and "strongly suggest[ed] that the majority of Festigoers would support a 'no penis' policy that would allow postoperative male-to-female transsexuals" to attend Michfest. At the 2000 event, staff gave arrivals a sheet saying that the festival may deny "admission to individuals who self-declare as male-to-female transsexuals or female-to-male transsexuals now living as men (or [ask] them to leave if they enter)."

Critics argued that the womyn-born womyn intention constituted discrimination against transgender people and in 1995, Camp Trans, an annual protest event held concurrently with Michfest that operated adjacent to the festival venue, was launched. It was restored as "Son of Camp Trans" in 1999 and lasted until 2010, when the United States Forest Service thereafter revoked its camping permit due to "allegations of violence and vandalism at the Festival, and...a confrontation...near the gates of MichFest".

In a 2005 interview with Amy Ray, Vogel defended the intention, stating that "having a space for women, who are born women, to come together for a week, is a healthy, whole, loving space to provide for women who have that experience. To label that as transphobic is, to me, as misplaced as saying the women-of-color tent is racist, or to say that a transsexual-only space, a gathering of folks of women who are born men is misogynist. I have always in my heart believed in the politics and the culture of separate time and space." In a 2006 press release, Vogel stated that "we strongly assert there is nothing transphobic with choosing to spend one week with womyn who were born as, and have lived their lives as, womyn."

Trans–bi activist Julia Serano, writing in 2007, criticized Michigan's policy as transmisogyny and pointed to a double standard: trans men were allowed at the festival, but trans women were not; in effect, this meant that trans men were treated as if they were women. She accused Michigan's policy of being inherently sexist against women and going against the very idea of a women's music festival, rebutted various statements put forth by Michfest in support of their policy, and described the preventing of pre-op trans women as phallocentric.

In 2013, transgender activist Red Durkin launched a Change.org petition asking performers to boycott Michfest until the womyn-born womyn intention was abolished. In response, Vogel stated that "I reject the assertion that creating a time and place for WBW to gather is inherently transphobic. This is a false dichotomy and one that prevents progress and understanding." Shortly after the petition was launched, the Indigo Girls announced that 2013 would be their last year at the festival while the intention was in place, releasing a statement that "we strongly feel that the time is long overdue for a change of intention, to one that states very plainly the inclusion of Trans Womyn."

In 2014, LGBT advocacy group Equality Michigan boycotted Michfest. The boycott was joined by the Human Rights Campaign (HRC), GLAAD, the National Center for Lesbian Rights (NCLR), and the National LGBTQ Task Force. Michfest accused the boycott of being "based on misrepresentations, purposeful omissions, and selective editing of prior Festival statements on this issue," with Vogel referring to the boycott as "McCarthy-era blacklist tactics". The NCLR and National LGBTQ Task Force would later withdraw their support for the boycott, as they felt it would not be "ultimately productive" in realizing its objective stating, "We have not abandoned our efforts to work for a fully inclusive Michfest. Our goal is a Michfest that fully welcomes Trans women."

Protests against the intention resulted in criticism of artists who had performed or been invited to Michfest. Bitch, of the band Bitch and Animal, attracted criticism for choosing to play at MWMF, resulting in the Boston Dyke March canceling an appearance by her in 2007, and she was also pulled or dis-invited from several other music festivals. Members of The Butchies and Le Tigre claimed to have been "verbally attacked, endlessly harassed and physically threatened" for deciding to play at the festival. In October 2013, filmmaker Sara St. Martin Lynne was asked to resign from the board of the Bay Area Girls Rock Camp for attending Michfest.

Michfest also had the stated intention that attendees' gender should not be challenged, and it was reported that transgender women attended the festival without revealing their status. This approach by the festival was criticized as equivalent to "Don't ask, don't tell" by Emily Dievendorf of Equality Michigan, Riki Wilchins of GenderPAC, and Julia Serano.

Closure in 2015
Michfest celebrated its 40th anniversary in 2015. On April 21, Lisa Vogel announced via Facebook that it would also be the last festival.  Vogel wrote in her statement:
 There have been struggles; there is no doubt about that. This is part of our truth, but it is not — and never has been — our defining story. The Festival has been the crucible for nearly every critical cultural and political issue the lesbian feminist community has grappled with for four decades. Those struggles have been a beautiful part of our collective strength; they have never been a weakness.

Status of property
In 2017, a nonprofit organization, known as the We Want the Land Coalition, entered into a contract to purchase the land from former festival producer, Lisa Vogel. WWTLC intends to make the land accessible to women who want to organize events on it. Smaller events were planned for the summer of 2019. Fern Fest, an event resembling Michfest, though trans inclusive, was held in August of 2022.

Operations

Activities and services
Attendance at the Michfest ranged from 3,000 to 10,000. Women built the stages, ran the lighting and sound systems, made trash collection rounds, served as electricians, mechanics, security, medical and psychological support, cooked meals for thousands over open fire pits, provided childcare, and facilitated workshops covering various topics of interest to the attendees, who were referred to as "festies". Up to one month was spent building the festival grounds, and dismantling them at the close of the event.

Management decisions were made through worker community meetings. Community service support included ASL interpretation at performances, mental and physical health care, Alcoholics Anonymous meetings, camping for disabled women, as well as a tent solely for women of color.

Writing from a personal perspective for The Village Voice in fall 1994, musician and Festival kitchen worker Gretchen Phillips (co-founder of the band Two Nice Girls) said: "I had never seen so many breasts before, so many bare asses, so much damn skin on such a vast terrain. I decided to make that weekend all about studying my body issues" and "I've always used Mich as a place to charge my batteries for the rest of the year, planning my life around being there in August and learning my lessons, both fun and hard."

Male children age four and under were allowed within the festival. Childcare for girls and boys under five was provided. A summer camp, Brother Sun Boys Camp, was available for boys aged 5 to 10.

Production and performances
Artists from multiple genres performed at Michfest, including classical, jazz, folk, hard rock, acoustic, bluegrass and gospel. The Festival created a high-tech production with three stages in a rural outdoor venue. Notable performers included Margie Adam, BETTY, Bitch, Tracy Chapman, Lea DeLaria, Melissa Ferrick, Mary Gauthier, Indigo Girls, Marga Gomez, Valerie June, Holly Near, Carole Pope, Vicki Randle, Jane Siberry, Jill Sobule, Cheryl Wheeler, Dar Williams, Cris Williamson, and Sarah Bettens (Sam Bettens).

Michfest Half-Way Soirée
In 2005, festival attendee Lisa A. Snyder created the "Michfest Half-Way Soirée" in New York City to support the local Michigan Womyn's Music Festival community, female musicians, and women-owned businesses. Half-Way to Michfest Parties (sometimes also called Mid-Way Parties or Michfest Half-Way Parties) were subsequently held in many locations.

See also

 Herstory
 Lesbian erasure
 Lesbian feminism
 Radical feminism
 Trans-exclusionary radical feminism
 Women's Week Provincetown
 Womyn
 Ruth Dworin, feminist activist who recorded Michfest for historical purposes
 Ruth Ellis, lesbian activist and staple of Michfest who became oldest known surviving "out" lesbian
 List of historic rock festivals

Notes

References

Further reading

  (Originally published in Lesbian Ethics.)
 
 
 
 
 
 

 Books and journals

 
 
 
 
 
 
 

 Thesis

External links
 Official website (Archive)
 Festival Letters and Statements to the Community, Michfest (Archive)
 Michigan Womyn's Music Festival records at the Sophia Smith Collection, Smith College Special Collections
 
  (Interview with Lisa Vogel)

1976 establishments in Michigan
2015 disestablishments in Michigan
Music festivals established in 1976
Recurring events disestablished in 2015
Feminism and transgender
Feminist events
Lesbian events
Lesbian feminism
Lesbian history
Lesbian separatism
LGBT music festivals
Women-only spaces
Women's festivals
Women's music
Feminist art organizations in the United States
Folk festivals in the United States
Lesbian culture in the United States
Pop music festivals in the United States
Rock festivals in the United States
Annual events in Michigan
LGBT culture in Michigan
Music festivals in Michigan
Women in Michigan
Tourist attractions in Oceana County, Michigan